Peycho Kanev is a poet, writer and translator born in Silistra, Bulgaria.

Publications 

Kanev has been published in over 900 literary journals. His poems appeared in many literary magazines, including Poetry Quarterly, Evergreen Review, Hawaii Review, Cordite Poetry Review, Sheepshead Review, Off the Coast, JMWW, The Coachella Review, Mascara Literary Review, The Mayo Review, Two Thirds North, Sierra Nevada Review, and The Cleveland Review, among many others.

He is the author of multiple poetry collections and chapbooks and has participated in collaborative books.

The year 2009 marked Peycho Kanev's first book publication. There were two books published in 2009, one by the American micro-press please press, and one by the Bulgarian publisher, Ciela. The book published by please press was r, a discursive poetry book with writing by Kanev and Felino A. Soriano and visual art by Duane Locke. The book received limited critical notice among the independent literary community. The book published by Ciela Soft and Publishing was Разходка през стените.

The year 2010 was another two-book year for Kanev. Again publishing books on both sides of the Atlantic Ocean, Desperate, NY released Bone Silence''', which was edited by Edward Wells of please press. Ciela also published Kanev's Американски тетрадки (American Notebooks) was published by Ciela in Bulgaria.

In 2013 Peycho Kanev continued his schedule of publishing two books, one in the United States of America and one in Bulgaria. This year marked the return of Kanev to please press, this time contributing to the discursive book project, thrw: 3 | w, which included poetry by Felino A. Soriano and prose by Steve Calamars. In Bulgaria, Kanev's book Уиски в тенекиена кутия (Whiskey in a Tin Can) was published by Janet-45 Print and Publishing.

In 2015 Peycho Kanev released his next book, the poetry collection Живо месо (Raw Meat''). It was published by the poetry publishing house Da in Bulgaria.

References

External links 
 Peycho Kanev's Profile at the Contemporary Bulgarian Writers Website
 Author profile

Living people
21st-century Bulgarian poets
Bulgarian male poets
21st-century male writers
1980 births